Hsieh Su-wei and Peng Shuai were the defending champions, but lost to Anabel Medina Garrigues and Yaroslava Shvedova in the second round.
Květa Peschke and Katarina Srebotnik won the title, defeating Sara Errani and Roberta Vinci in the final, 4–0, ret.

Seeds
The top four seeds received a bye into the second round.

Draw

Finals

Top half

Bottom half

References
 Main Draw

Italian Open - Doubles
Women's Doubles